Breakaway is a suburb in the City of Mount Isa, Queensland, Australia.

Geography 
The Leichhard River flows north–south through the town of Mount Isa, dividing the suburbs of the town into "mineside" (west of the Leichhardt River) and "townside" (east of the Leichhardt River). Breakaway is a "townside" suburb.

History 
Breakaway was named on 1 September 1973 by the Queensland Place Names Board after Breakaway Creek which flows past it. On 16 March 2001 the status of Breakaway was changed from a locality to a suburb.

References 

City of Mount Isa
Suburbs of Mount Isa